The vice president of the Republic of Liberia is the second-highest executive official in Liberia, and one of only two elected executive offices along with the president. The vice president is elected on the same ticket with the president to a six-year term. In the event of the death, resignation or removal of the president, the vice president ascends to the presidency, and holds the position for the remainder of their predecessor's term. The vice president also serves as the president of the Senate and may cast a vote in the event of a tie. The current vice president is Jewel Taylor, serving under president George Weah. She began her term on January 22, 2018.

Qualifications
Article 52 of the Constitution lays out the qualifications for candidates for vice president. To be eligible for office under the current Constitution, a vice presidential candidate must:
be a natural born citizen of Liberia;
be at least thirty-five years old;
own real property valued at least $25,000;
have resided in Liberia for at least ten years.

Additionally, the vice president may not reside in the same county as the president.

Succession
Under Article 63(b), the vice president ascends to the presidency in the event of president's death, resignation, impeachment, or when the president is declared incapable of carrying out the duties of the office. In the event of ascension, the vice president serves as president for the remainder of their predecessor's term, though this period is not considered a term for the purposes of term limits to the presidency. According to Article 63(a), should the president-elect die or become otherwise incapacitated before his or her inauguration, the vice president-elect is sworn in as president in their place, though a term of this nature does constitute a term for the purposes of determining term limits.

To date, five vice presidents have ascended to the presidency, either due to the president's death, resignation, or removal from office: James Skivring Smith, Alfred Francis Russell, William D. Coleman, William Tolbert, and Moses Blah.

There have been twelve vacancies in the office, the first of which occurred between October 26, 1871 and January 1, 1872; after the ascension of James Skivring Smith to the office of president. The most recent vacancy was between August 11, 2003 and January 16, 2006; after the ascension of Moses Blah to the office of president and prior to the election of Joseph Boakai.

List of officeholders
Political parties

Other factions

Timeline

See also
Lists of office-holders
List of current vice presidents

Notes

References

 
Government of Liberia
Liberia, Vice-Presidents of
Liberia, Vice-President
Liberia
Liberia politics-related lists